Cameron Bradfield (born September 14, 1987) is a former American football offensive tackle. He was signed by the Jacksonville Jaguars as an undrafted free agent in 2011. He played college football at Grand Valley State University.

Early years
Bradfield attended Creston High School, where he was an All-city selection at tight end as a senior. He also practiced basketball.

He accepted a football scholarship from Grand Valley State University, where he was converted into an offensive lineman and became a three-year starter. He was named the starter at right tackle as a sophomore. He was named the starter at left tackle as a senior.

Professional career

Jacksonville Jaguars
Bradfield was signed by the Jacksonville Jaguars as an undrafted free agent after the 2011 NFL Draft. He spent three full seasons with the Jaguars as the team's swing tackle. In 2014, he started the first two games of the regular season in place of injured starting right tackle Austin Pasztor, before being waived on September 16.

Atlanta Falcons
Bradfield was signed by the Atlanta Falcons on September 30, 2014, after tackle Lamar Holmes was placed on the injured reserve list. He was released on November 28, in order to activate safety William Moore.

Arizona Cardinals
On January 1, 2015, Bradfield was signed to a reserve/future contract by the Arizona Cardinals. On September 5, he was released by the Cardinals.

Dallas Cowboys
On July 25, 2016, he was signed as a free agent by the Dallas Cowboys. He was placed on the injured reserve list with a knee injury on August 16.

References

External links
Arizona Cardinals bio

1987 births
Living people
American football offensive tackles
Arizona Cardinals players
Atlanta Falcons players
Dallas Cowboys players
Grand Valley State Lakers football players
Jacksonville Jaguars players
Players of American football from Grand Rapids, Michigan